The 2022 Grand Prix of Long Beach (formally known as the Acura Grand Prix of Long Beach) was a sports car race held at Long Beach street circuit in Long Beach, California on April 9, 2022. It was the third round of the 2022 IMSA SportsCar Championship and the first round of the 2022 WeatherTech Sprint Cup.

Background

Entries

A total of 26 cars took part in the event, split across three classes. 6 were entered in DPi, 6 in GTD Pro, and 15 in GTD.

Qualifying

Qualifying results

Race

Results 

 The #25 BMW M Team RLL entry was demoted to last in the GTD Pro class as Connor De Phillippi exceeded maximum drive time for the race.

References

External links

Grand Prix of Long Beach
Grand Prix of Long Beach
Grand Prix of Long Beach
2022 WeatherTech SportsCar Championship season